The Night Message is a 1924 American silent drama film directed by Perley Poore Sheehan and written by Raymond L. Schrock and Perley Poore Sheehan. The film stars Howard Truesdale, Gladys Hulette, Charles Cruz, Margaret Seddon, Norman Rankow, and Robert Gordon. The film was released on March 17, 1924, by Universal Pictures.

Plot
As described in a film magazine review, the Lefferts and Longstreet families live in a southern mountain region and are enemies. Elsie Lefferts and Lee Longstreet are sweethearts  Old Man Lefferts favors the suit of telegraph operator Lem Beeman. The latter, while hunting, accididentally shoots Elsie's brother, Harney. Lee is blamed for the killing and is arrested and sentenced to death. The telegraph wires are down in a storm when Lem decides to confess. He reaches the prison in time to save Lee but is himself killed. The lovers are reunited.

Cast

References

External links
 

1924 films
1920s English-language films
Silent American drama films
1924 drama films
Universal Pictures films
American silent feature films
American black-and-white films
1920s American films